Rice People is a 1994 Cambodian drama film directed and co-written by Rithy Panh. Adapted from the 1966 novel Ranjau Sepanjang Jalan (No Harvest But a Thorn), by Malaysian author Shahnon Ahmad, which is set in the Malaysian state of Kedah, Rice People is the story of a rural family in post-Khmer Rouge Cambodia, struggling to bring in a single season's rice crop. It was filmed in the Cambodian village of Kamreang, in the Kien Svay and Boeung Thom areas of Kandal Province near Phnom Penh, on the banks of the Mekong River. The cast features both professional and non-professional actors.

The film premiered in the main competition at the 1994 Cannes Film Festival and was submitted to the 67th Academy Awards, the first time a Cambodian film had been submitted as a possible nominee for Best Foreign Language Film.

Plot
In Cambodia, where families were torn apart in the communist Khmer Rouge's genocidal bid to transform the country into an agrarian utopia, it is ironic that people have lost touch with the land. For a generation of children, the rice comes not from the ground, but from a sack, offloaded from the back of a United Nations relief truck.

So it is in these uncertain times, that a Cambodian family is attempting to grow rice. The father, Pouev, is concerned that the family's plot of land is shrinking, and he might not be able to grow a big enough crop.

The mother, Om, is worried for her husband, and her worst fears are confirmed when Poeuv steps on a poisonous thorn, and then, after a protracted period of being bedridden, dies of infection.

Om is unable to handle the pressure of being the head of the family, nor does she have the strength to tend to the rice fields. She turns to alcohol and gambling and is eventually locked up for her mental illness.

Responsibility for bringing in the crop and raising her six sisters falls on the oldest girl, Sakha.

Cast
 Peng Phan as Om
 Mom Soth as Poeuv
 Chhim Naline as Sakha
 Va Simorn as Sokhoeun
 Sophy Sodany as Sokhon
 Muong Danyda as Sophon
 Pen Sopheary as Sophoeun
 Proum Mary as Sophat
 Sam Kourour as Sopheap

Release
Rice People premiered at the 1994 Cannes Film Festival in the main competition for the Palme d'Or, a prize that went to Pulp Fiction. The film had its North American premiere at the Toronto International Film Festival.

The film was submitted to the 67th Academy Awards as a possible nominee for Best Foreign Language Film, the first time a Cambodian film had been submitted to the Academy Awards.

See also
 List of submissions to the 67th Academy Awards for Best Foreign Language Film
 List of Cambodian submissions for the Academy Award for Best Foreign Language Film

References

External links

1994 films
1994 drama films
Cambodian drama films
Khmer-language films
Films based on Malaysian novels
Films about farmers
Films directed by Rithy Panh